The Hazel River is a  tributary of the Rappahannock River in northern Virginia in the United States. Via the Rappahannock, it is part of the Chesapeake Bay watershed. It rises in Shenandoah National Park and flows generally eastwardly through Rappahannock and Culpeper counties. The Hazel's largest tributaries are the Hughes River, which joins it at the border of Rappahannock and Culpeper counties, and the Thornton River, which joins it in Culpeper County.

See also
List of Virginia rivers

References

Rivers of Virginia
Tributaries of the Rappahannock River
Rivers of Culpeper County, Virginia
Rivers of Rappahannock County, Virginia